Médée is a tragedy written by French dramatist Jean Anouilh in 1946, and directed by André Barsacq at the Théâtre de l'Atelier in Paris on March 25, 1953.

Anouilh's text is inspired by the myth of Medea. The action is centred on a few characters : Medea, Jason, Creon, and Medea's nurse. The plays ends with Medea's death in the flames, with Jason preventing any help to be given to her.

The myth is updated, with Medea for instance living on a trailer-park. Moreover, Anouilh analyses with more depth male-female relationships

1946 plays
Plays by Jean Anouilh
Plays set in ancient Greece
Plays based on Medea (Euripides play)